NTQ may refer to:

 Noto Airport (IATA: NTQ)
 Non-tax qualified, a long-term care insurance